Igreja de São Quintino is a church in Sobral de Monte Agraço, Portugal. It is classified as a National Monument.

Churches in Lisbon District
National monuments in Lisbon District